Early riser may refer to:

 Waking up early
 Early Riser, the debut studio album by Taylor McFerrin
 "early RISER", a track from the album Fakevox by Japanese electronic music band Plus-Tech Squeeze Box
 Early Riser (2018), novel by Jasper Fforde